"Scars to Your Beautiful" is a song recorded by Canadian singer and songwriter Alessia Cara. Def Jam Recordings and Universal Music Group serviced it to contemporary hit radio on July 26, 2016, as the third single from her debut studio album Know-It-All (2015) on November 13, 2015. A pop ballad, the song was written by Cara along with its producers Pop & Oak, Sebastian Kole, and DJ Frank E.

In the United States, "Scars to Your Beautiful"  peaked at number eight. It marked Cara's second top-ten single on US Billboard Hot 100.

Background

Cara felt motivated to make the song after viewing an episode of Botched. In an interview with Idolator's Mike Wass, Cara stated about the process behind the song:

Critical reception
The Guardians Kitty Empire said that "There's substance on Scars to Your Beautiful, where Cara tackles the beauty myth à la Beyoncé. The verses pack some good stuff – 'What's a little bit of hunger? I can go a little bit longer.'" and later went on to say "the thumping motivational chorus merely suggests we are all stars." Katy Iandoli of Idolator stated "Scars to Your Beautiful is a modern-day version of TLC's 'Unpretty', in its acknowledgment of the beauty in both visible and invisible imperfections."

Billboard ranked "Scars to Your Beautiful" at number 77 on their Billboards 100 Best Pop Songs of 2016: Critics' Picks" list, commenting “Body-positivity anthems typically don't get this dark, but on "Scars To Your Beautiful," Alessia Cara isn't afraid to talk cutting, tears and eating disorders, before getting to the uplifting chorus, where she delivers some of the most empowering, horizon-expanding lyrics of this year: ‘You don't have to change a thing / The world could change its heart.’”

Music video
The music video was published on July 11, 2016, with a cameo appearance by singer JoJo.

Background
On the concept of the music video, Cara said in an interview with Cosmopolitan: "I wanted to do this kind of video for a very long time. Since we had this song — and since we knew it was going to be a single — I had this vision of many different cinematic shots of different kinds of people. I wanted all kinds of people — young, old, whatever their situation, whether it's visible scars, non-visible scars — just a bunch of different women, and there are some men in there as well because it can reach out to guys too. But I wanted real shots of real people telling their stories, and showing the story through little vignettes."

Impact and usage in media 
The song is featured in episodes of the television shows The Bold Type and Law & Order: Special Victims Unit.

The song was used in the international trailer of A Wrinkle in Time, as well as the background music for the introduction video of Dirt Rally 2.0.

In 2018, the song was featured in television commercials for ULTA Beauty.

Track listing 
CD Single
"Scars to Your Beautiful" – 3:50
"Scars to Your Beautiful" (NOTD Remix) – 3:19

Digital download – Remixes
"Scars to Your Beautiful" (Luca Schreiner Remix) – 4:22
"Scars to Your Beautiful" (NOTD Remix) – 3:19
"Scars to Your Beautiful" (Cages Remix) – 4:28
"Scars to Your Beautiful" (Joe Mason Remix) – 3:51
"Scars to Your Beautiful" ( Remix) – 3:32

Charts

Weekly charts

Year-end charts

Certifications

Release history

See also
List of Billboard Adult Contemporary number ones of 2017

References

2015 songs
2016 singles
Alessia Cara songs
Def Jam Recordings singles
MTV Video Music Award for Best Video with a Social Message
Music videos directed by Aaron A
Song recordings produced by Pop & Oak
Songs written by Pop Wansel
2010s ballads
Synth-pop ballads
Pop ballads
Songs with feminist themes
Body image in popular culture
Songs written by Alessia Cara
Songs written by Oak Felder
Songs written by Sebastian Kole